cis-Dichlorobis(ethylenediamine)cobalt(III) chloride is a salt with the formula [CoCl2(en)2]Cl (en = ethylenediamine). The salt consists of a cationic coordination complex and a chloride anion. It is a violet diamagnetic solid that is soluble in water.  One chloride ion in this salt readily undergoes ion exchange, but the two other chlorides are less reactive, being bound to the metal center.

Synthesis and optical resolution
Cis-dichlorobis(ethylenediamine)cobalt(III) chloride is obtained by heating a solution of trans-dichlorobis(ethylenediamine)cobalt(III) chloride, e.g. using a steam bath.

The racemate can be resolved into two enantiomers (Λ and Δ) by the formation of the d-α-bromocamphor-π-sulfonate salt. The diastereomeric salts are separated by recrystallization.  After their purification, the individual diastereomers are converted back to the chloride salt by reaction with ice cold hydrochloric acid.

Comparison of cis and trans isomers
This salt is less soluble than the dull-green isomeric trans-dichlorobis(ethylenediamine)cobalt(III) chloride.  This pair of isomers were significant in the development of the area of coordination chemistry.  The chiral cis isomer can be obtained by heating the trans isomer.  Both isomers of dichlorobis(ethylenediamine)cobalt(III) chloride have often been used in stereochemical studies and as intermediates (like tris(ethylenediamine)cobalt(III) chloride) for the preparation of other cobalt salt complexes.

References 

Cobalt complexes
Cobalt(III) compounds
Chlorides
Metal halides
Ethylenediamine complexes
Chloro complexes